The Giant Magellan Telescope (GMT) is a ground-based extremely large telescope under construction, as part of the US Extremely Large Telescope Program (US-ELTP), . It will consist of seven 8.4 m (27.6 ft) diameter primary segments, that will observe optical and near infrared (320–25000 nm) light, with the resolving power of a 24.5 m (80.4 ft) primary mirror and collecting area equivalent to a 22.0 m (72.2 ft) one, which is about 368 square meters. The telescope is expected to have a resolving power 10 times that of the Hubble Space Telescope and four times that of the James Webb Space Telescope, although it will be unable to image in the same infrared frequencies available to telescopes in space. , six mirrors have been cast and the construction of the summit facility has begun.

A total of seven primary mirrors are planned, but it will begin operation with four.  The US$1 billion project is US-led in partnership with Australia, Brazil, and South Korea, with Chile as the host country.

Site 

The site has been chosen as the new instrument's location because of its outstanding astronomical seeing and clear weather throughout most of the year. Moreover, due to the sparsity of population centers and other favorable geographical conditions, the night sky in most of the surrounding Atacama Desert region is not only free from atmospheric pollution, but in addition it is probably one of the places least affected by light pollution, making the area one of the best spots on Earth for long-term astronomical observation. Major site preparation began with the first blast to level the mountain peak on 23 March 2012. In November 2015, construction was started at the site, with a ground-breaking ceremony.

The excavation for the foundations was completed in early 2019. As of August 2022, the site is ready for the pouring of the foundation's concrete.

Mirrors 

The telescope will use seven of the world's largest mirrors as primary mirror segments, each  in diameter. These segments will then be arranged with one mirror in the center and the other six arranged symmetrically around it. The challenge is that the outer six mirror segments will be off-axis, and although identical to each other, will not be individually radially symmetrical, necessitating a modification of the usual polishing and testing procedures.

The mirrors are being constructed by the University of Arizona's Steward Observatory Richard F. Caris Mirror Lab. The casting of the first mirror, in a rotating furnace, was completed on November 3, 2005, but the grinding and polishing were still going on 6 years later when the second mirror was cast, on 14 January 2012.
A third segment was cast in August 2013, the fourth in September 2015, the fifth in 2017, and the sixth in 2021.
The casting of each mirror uses 20 tons of E6 borosilicate glass from the Ohara Corporation of Japan and takes about 12–13 weeks.
After being cast, they need to cool for about six months.

Polishing of the first mirror was completed in November 2012.
As this was an off-axis segment, a wide array of new optical tests and laboratory infrastructure had to be developed to polish the mirror.

The intention is to build seven identical off-axis mirrors, so that a spare is available to substitute for a segment being recoated, a 1–2 week (per segment) process required every 1–2 years.
While the complete telescope will use seven mirrors, it is planned to begin operation with four mirrors.

The primary mirror array as a whole will have a focal ratio (focal length divided by diameter) of f/0.71. For an individual segment – being one third that diameter – this results in a focal ratio of f/2.14.
The overall focal ratio of the complete telescope will be f/8 and the optical prescription is an aplanatic Gregorian telescope. Like all modern large telescopes it will make use of adaptive optics.

Scientists expect very high quality images due to the very large aperture and advanced adaptive optics. Image resolution should exceed that of the Hubble Space Telescope.

Support structure 
The telescope structure is an alt-azimuth design and it will stand on a pier that is 22 meters in diameter.

In late October 2019 GMTO announced the signing of a contract with German company MT Mechatronics (subsidiary of OHB SE) and Illinois-based Ingersoll Machine Tools, to design, build and install the GMT's telescope structure. The structure will weigh 1,800 tons without mirrors and instruments. With mirrors and instruments it will weigh 2,100 tons. This structure will float on a film of oil (50 microns thick), being supported by a number of hydrostatic bearings. The structure is expected to be delivered to Chile at the end of 2025.

As of August 2022, construction of a 40,000 square foot facility at Ingersoll Machine Tools in Rockford, Illinois to build the telescope structure is complete, with the construction of the telescope structure in anticipation.

Wavefront control and adaptive optics (AO) 
The primary mirrors are housed inside a "cell" which protect the mirrors. Pneumatic actuators will push on the back of the primary mirrors to correct for the effects of gravity and temperature variations on the mirrors.

The GMT's Adaptive Optics system will be built into the secondary mirrors which will be deformable. The Adaptive Secondary Mirrors (or ASMs) consist of a thin sheet of glass that is bonded to more than 7000 independently controlled voice coil actuators. These actuators will be able to push and pull on the mirrors over 1000 times a second to correct for wavefront distortions introduced by turbulence in the Earth's atmosphere.

The GMT will have several types of adaptive optics. The Ground layer AO allows corrections over a large field of view (≥ 10 arcmin). The Natural Guide Star AO is needed to produce diffraction-limited corrections over a small field of view (20-30 arcseconds). The Laser Tomography AO uses six laser guide stars and a faint, natural guide star to extend diffraction-limited corrections to regions without a bright guide star. The performance will be similar to Natural Guide Star AO, but with reduced contrast.

Science instruments 
The planned first light instruments are four instruments and one facility fiber positioning system. The fiber positioning system is necessary because of the wide field of view of the GMT. Using this system it is possible to observe multiple targets over the entire field with one or more of the spectrographs.

 GMT-Consortium Large Earth Finder (G-CLEF) - an optical band echelle spectrograph
 GMT Multi-object Astronomical and Cosmological Spectrograph (GMACS) - a visible multi-object spectrograph
 GMT Integral-Field Spectrograph (GMTIFS) - a near-IR IFU and AO imager
 GMT Near-IR spectrograph (GMTNIRS) - a near-IR spectrograph
 The Many Instrument Fiber System (MANIFEST) - a facility fiber system

Additionally the Commissioning Camera (ComCam) will be used to validate the Ground Layer Adaptive Optics performance of the GMT facility Adaptive Optics System.

Comparison 

The Giant Magellan Telescope is one of a new class of telescopes called extremely large telescopes with each design being much larger than previous telescopes. Other planned extremely large telescopes include the Extremely Large Telescope and the Thirty Meter Telescope.

Organizations 
The project is US-led in partnership with Australia, Brazil, and South Korea, with Chile as the host country. The following organizations are members of the consortium developing the telescope.
 University of Arizona (Department of Astronomy and Steward Observatory)
 Arizona State University (School of Earth and Space Exploration (SESE))
 Astronomy Australia Limited
 Australian National University (Research School of Astronomy and Astrophysics)
 Carnegie Observatories
 University of São Paulo (São Paulo Research Foundation – FAPESP)
 Harvard University (jointly; Center for Astrophysics  Harvard & Smithsonian (CfA))
 Korea Astronomy and Space Science Institute (한국천문연구원) (KASI)
 Smithsonian Institution (jointly; Center for Astrophysics  Harvard & Smithsonian (CfA))
 Texas A&M University
 University of Texas at Austin (Department of Astronomy at the University of Texas at Austin)
 University of Chicago (Astronomy & Astrophysics Department of the University of Chicago)

The Carnegie Observatories office in Pasadena has an outline of the GMT primary mirror array painted in its parking lot. In January 2018, WSP was awarded the contract to manage construction of the GMT.

Status of mirrors
There will be a total of eight primary mirror segments: one central mirror, six off-axis segments, and a spare off-axis segment which will be rotated into use as each segment is cleaned and recoated.  The mirrors are made of borosilicate glass and have a honeycomb structure below the mirror surface.  An adaptive secondary mirror is also designed for the telescope.  The telescope will begin observing with only four mirrors: the central and three off-axis segments.

 Mirror 1, cast in October 2005, completed in August 2012 with polishing completed with a surface accuracy of 19 nanometers RMS.
 Mirror 2, cast in January 2012, completed in 2019.
 Mirror 3, cast in August 2013, currently (August 2022) receiving the final touches on its polishing and is in final testing.
 Mirror 4, cast in September 2015. This is the central mirror. Currently (March 2021) the rear surface is polished and is having its load spreaders installed.
 Mirror 5, cast in November 2017.
 Mirror 6, cast in March 2021. Approximated to take 4 years to complete.
 Mirror 7, in planning, will be cast in 2023.
 Mirror 8, planned.

The secondary mirror, which is a deformable mirror tasked with correcting the atmospheric distortion of the light gathered by the telescope, has 7 segments and 1.1 meter diameter. The first segment is under construction as of August 2022.

See also 
 Atacama Desert
 Extremely Large Telescope
 Gran Telescopio Canarias
 List of largest optical reflecting telescopes
 List of optical telescopes 
 Magellan Telescopes
 Thirty Meter Telescope

References

External links
 Giant Magellan Telescope home page
 Lecture by director Patrick McCarthy on technologies behind GMT
 Article from the MIT news office
 New Scientist article on the telescope
 COSMOS article on the telescope
 Painted outline of the mirrors at the parking lot of the Observatories of the Carnegie Institution in Pasadena
 J. Rosenberg - Seeing Stars (2013) - Harvard Magazine
 J. Davis - Making mirrors for the Giant Magellan Telescope (2013) - The Planetary Society

Optical telescopes
Telescopes under construction
Astronomical observatories in Chile
Buildings and structures under construction in Chile